Clair Armstrong Callan (March 29, 1920 – May 28, 2005) was an American Democratic Party politician.

Born in Odell, Nebraska, the grandson of Irish immigrants, Callan graduated from Nebraska State Teachers College, now known as Peru State College. He served as an officer in the United States Navy during World War II on a destroyer in the Pacific Theater.

He served on the Odell Village Board, Odell School Board, Gage County School Reorganization Board, Gage County Fair Board, and the Gage County Extension Board. He was chairman of both the Governor's Committee on State Government Reorganization Board and the Nebraska Power Review Board. He worked as a farmer, stockman, and in the hardware and farm supply business.

After losing his first race for Nebraska's 1st Congressional District in 1962 to incumbent Ralph Beermann, Callan was narrowly elected to the Eighty-ninth United States Congress in 1964, serving from January 3, 1965, to January 3, 1967.  He was defeated for reelection to the Ninetieth United States Congress in 1966 by Robert Vernon Denney and lost a rematch to him in 1968.  In 1970, when Denney decided not so seek reelection, Callan ran as an independent when he failed to receive the Democratic nomination, winning 26% in a three way race and finishing ahead of the Democratic nominee. He was Deputy Aadministrator of the Rural Electrification Administration from 1967 to 1968 and president of the Allied Industries International, Inc. and Agri-Tech in Nashville, Tennessee. He died on May 28, 2005, in Fairbury, Nebraska.

He was a member of the United Methodist Church, a member of the American Legion, Veterans of Foreign Wars, the Freemasons, the Shriners, the Elks, the Odd Fellows and of the Optimist Club.

References

 
 
 
 

1920 births
2005 deaths
20th-century American politicians
20th-century Methodists
21st-century Methodists
United States Navy personnel of World War II
American people of Irish descent
American United Methodists
Democratic Party members of the United States House of Representatives from Nebraska
Farmers from Nebraska
People from Gage County, Nebraska
Peru State College alumni
School board members in Nebraska